Denis Éthier (25 March 1926 in Sainte-Justine-de-Newton, Quebec – 15 March 2017 in Alexandria, Ontario) was a Liberal party member of the House of Commons of Canada. His career included business such as merchandising.

He represented the Ontario riding of Glengarry—Prescott—Russell which he first won in the 1972 federal election. He replaced his brother Viateur Éthier, who had represented the riding under its previous name Glengarry—Prescott since 1962. He was re-elected there in 1974, 1979 and 1980. He left federal politics in 1984 and did not participate in that year's federal election after serving four consecutive terms from the 29th to the 32nd Canadian Parliaments.

References

External links
 

1926 births
2017 deaths
Members of the House of Commons of Canada from Ontario
Liberal Party of Canada MPs
Franco-Ontarian people